Viejo is a comarca in La Rioja province in Spain.

References